Platypus Cove is a 1983 Australian television film about a tugboat.

Cast
Tony Barry as Frank Nelson
Carmen Duncan as Margaret Davis
Simone Buchanan as Jenny Nelson
Paul Smith as Jim Mason
Martin Lewis as Peter Nelson
Aileen Britton as Grandma Mason
Henri Szeps as Winston Bell
Mark Hembrow as Paddy O'Neil
Dennis Miller as Sergeant Don Bailey
Bill Kerr as Mr. Anderson
 Brian Anderson as Shop Manager
 Allen Bickford as Ted Finch
 Robin Bowering as Dr. Rinaldi
 Robert Carne as Boxing Second
 John Chedid as Michael Peters
 Tim Grogan as Boxing Second
 John Ley as Leo Baldwin
 Patrick Mansfield as Boat Seller

References

External links

Australian television films
1983 television films
1983 films
1980s English-language films
Films directed by Peter Maxwell
1980s Australian films